Zelzah may refer to two:

 Zelzah (biblical place) an unidentified Bible location where King Saul was to meet three men
 The original name of Northridge, Los Angeles